Giorgio Ferroni (12 April 1908 – 1981) was an Italian film director.

Life and career
Giorgio Ferroni was born in Perugia on 12 April 1908. Ferroni began his career in film with short documentaries during World War II. He directed his first dramatic film The Thrill of the Skies in 1939.

At the time of filming The Night of the Devils, Ferroni was almost completely deaf and had to direct the film with the help of a hearing aid. Following the release of the film, a new project titled E i mostri uscirono dalle loro tane. Ferroni only helmed one more film with the comedy Antonio e Placido: attenti ragazzi...chi rompe paga which he is credited as Calvin Jackson Padget, a name he used for directing Westerns in the 1960s. Ferroni died in 1981.

Selected filmography
Note: The films listed as N/A are not necessarily chronological.

References

Sources

External links 
 

1908 births
People from Perugia
1981 deaths
Italian film directors
20th-century Italian screenwriters
Spaghetti Western directors
Italian film editors
Italian male screenwriters
20th-century Italian male writers